Amqan (also Romanized as Āmqān, Āmaqān, and Āmeqān; also known as Āghmeqān, Amagan, Amahan, and Ameghan) is a village in Sahand Rural District, in the Central District of Osku County, East Azerbaijan Province, Iran. At the 2006 census, its population was 794, in 185 families.

References 

Populated places in Osku County